WJZK may refer to:

 WJZK-LP, a low-power radio station (97.3 FM) licensed to serve Ft. Walton Beach, Florida, United States
 WNNP, a radio station (104.3 FM) licensed to serve Richwood, Ohio, United States, which held the call sign WJZK from 1999 to 2009
 WIWF, a radio station (96.9 FM) licensed to serve Charleston, South Carolina, United States, which held the call sign WJZK from 1996 to 1997
 WCDZ, a radio station (95.1 FM) licensed to Dresden, Tennessee, United States, which held the call sign WJZK from 1991 to 1992